Nikita Bespalov (born 28 December 1987) is a Russian professional ice hockey Goaltender currently playing for HC 21 Prešov of the Slovak Extraliga.

He joined Spartak Moscow on a one-year contract after playing three seasons with HC Sibir Novosibirsk on May 1, 2016.

References

External links

1987 births
Living people
HC CSKA Moscow players
HC Khimik Voskresensk players
Russian ice hockey goaltenders
HC Sibir Novosibirsk players
HC Spartak Moscow players
Ice hockey people from Moscow
Torpedo Nizhny Novgorod players
HC 21 Prešov players
Russian expatriate ice hockey people
Russian expatriate sportspeople in Slovakia
Expatriate ice hockey players in Slovakia